Priego is a municipality located in the Cuenca Province, Castilla-La Mancha, Spain. According to the census 2004 (INE), the municipality has a population of 1,052 inhabitants.

Notable people 
 Luis Ocaña (9 June 1945 – 19 May 1994) was a Spanish road bicycle racer who won the 1973 Tour de France and the 1970 Vuelta a España.

References

Municipalities in the Province of Cuenca